Le Temps des cerises is a French publishing house founded in 1993 by 33 writers.

Le Temps des cerises publishers 
The name of the house refers to the song Le Temps des cerises by Jean-Baptiste Clément. It was chosen to "indicate both the attachment to the ideals of the Paris Commune and to a certain tradition of popular poetry, most often obscured". The little "e" of CeRISES (cherries) saying in its own way that this hope maintained is in a time of CRISES...".

The catalog of Le Temps des cerises counts more than 700 titles. The house has created numerous series including "101 poèmes", the "Petite bibliothèque de poésie", "Romans des libertés" and "Liberté des romans", the "Petite collection rouge", the "Collection blanche", the series collections "Matière à pensées", "Le Merle moqueur" and "Histoire contemporaine", as well as the "Cahiers Roger Vailland"" and publishes the magazine Commune.

Books have been issued in co-publishing with the "Maison de la poésie Rhône-Alpes", the publishing houses  and Éditions du Noroît and took over the fund of the Ipomée editions. A series with Les Lettres Françaises and one with  have also been created.

Some themes 
Some themes dear to Le Temps des Cerises :
 Communism, globalization, liberalism, the Paris Commune, the working class, trade unionism, slavery, colonialism, the third world, the status of women, and so on.
 essays against capitalism, World Trade Organization, the International Monetary Fund, Nicolas Sarkozy, etc.
 essays on Louise Michel, Jean Jaurès, Vladimir Lenin, Joseph Staline, Maurice Thorez, Fidel Castro, Che Guevara, Hugo Chávez, etc.
And also:
 philosophical essays on Jean-Jacques Rousseau, Pierre Bourdieu
 literary essays on Victor Hugo, George Sand, Jules Verne, Émile Zola, Louis Aragon, Nazım Hikmet, Bernard Noël
 essays on art (including one on Pierre Soulages)

Some authors 
 History
 Hô Chi Minh, Henri Alleg
 World
 Danielle Bleitrach, 
 Politics
 Rosa Luxemburg, Noam Chomsky, Anicet Le Pors, René-Émile Piquet, Léo Figuères, André Gerin
 Economy
 Karl Marx, Samir Amin
 Society
 Gracchus, Friedrich Engels, Pier Paolo Pasolini, Danielle Mitterrand, Mumia Abu-Jamal
 Philosophy
 Louis Althusser
 Novels and short stories
 Jack London, Maxim Gorky, César Vallejo, Elsa Triolet, Robert Desnos, Nikolai Ostrovsky, Paul Nizan, Jacques Roumain, Jorge Amado, Pierre Courtade, Raymond Jean, René Ballet, Roger Bordier, Jacques Krier, Clément Lépidis, Pierre Gamarra, Luis de Miranda
 Tales
 Anton Chekhov
 Novels, short stories and essays on society and art
 Roger Vailland, Suzanne Bernard
 Novels, short stories and poetry
 Charles Dobzynski
 Novels and poetry
 Ernesto Cardenal, Jean Metellus.
 Political essays and poetry
 Louis Aragon
 Essays society and poetry
 John Berger.
 Poetry
 Omar Khayyam, Heinrich Heine, François Coppée, Carl Sandburg, Charles Vildrac, translation by Vladimir Maïakovski, Paul Éluard, Yánnis Rítsos, Jaroslav Seifert, Ilarie Voronca, Pablo Neruda, E.E. Cummings, Nazım Hikmet, Vladimir Pozner, Seamus Heaney, Rafael Alberti, Rouben Melik, Juan Gelman, Henri Deluy Jack Hirschman, Abdellatif Laâbi, Salah Al-Hamdani, Tahar Djaout, Maram al-Masri, Jean-Paul Guedj
 Poetry and theatre
 
 Poetry and literary essays
 , Alain Marc
 Literary essays
 Jean Ristat
 Songs
 Jean-Baptiste Clément, Eugène Pottier, Gaston Couté,

References

External links 
 Le temps des cerises, un éditeur au cœur de la lutte
 Le Temps des Cerises on ''L'Autre Livre
 Le Temps des Cerises on Ricochet-jeunes
 Le Temps des Cerises éditeur on Société.com
 Sortie de crise pour les éditions Le temps des cerises on Actualitté
 Le Temps des Cerises on YouTube

Book publishing companies of France
Companies established in 1993